Dr David Lloyd Roberts FRSE FRCP (1835–1920) was a 19th-century British gynaecologist and bibliophile.

Life
He was born in Stockport, the son of Robert Roberts, a cotton spinner. He was first apprenticed as a chemist before more formal education at Ripponden College. He then assisted Professor William Smith in his physiology classes at Owen's College in Manchester, being allowed to study Medicine in his spare hours before winning a place at St Andrews University. He did further postgraduate studies in Paris and London. He qualified MB in 1857and MD in 1859.

In 1858 he began work as Surgeon in Ordinary at St Marys Hospital for Women and Children in Manchester.

In 1880 he was elected a Fellow of the Royal Society of Edinburgh. His proposers were James Matthews Duncan, Sir Alexander Russell Simpson, Sir Thomas Grainger Stewart, and Angus Macdonald.

In 1885 he was appointed Gynaecological Surgeon to Manchester Royal Infirmary.

He retired from surgery in 1895 and died on 29 September 1920. He bequeathed a library of over 3000 largely medical books and 53 rare incunabula to the Royal College of Physicians in London and endowed them to provide the Lloyd Roberts Lectures which ran annually from 1921 to 1953. His literary collection of over 2000 books was bequeathed to the John Rylands Library.

Family

He was married to Martha Occleshaw daughter of W H Occleshaw. They had no children.

Artistic Recognition

His portrait was painted by William Orpen.

Publications
The Practice of Midwifery (1857)
A Student's Guide to Practical Midwifery (1876)
Sir Thomas Browne's Religio Medici (1892)
The Scientific Knowledge of Dante (1914)

References

1835 births
1920 deaths
People from Stockport
Alumni of the University of St Andrews
British gynaecologists
Fellows of the Royal Society of Edinburgh